Xzavier Dickson (born September 11, 1992) is a former American football linebacker. He was drafted with the 253rd pick of the 2015 NFL draft by the New England Patriots. Dickson signed onto the Atlanta Falcons on December 30, 2015. He played college football at Alabama.

College career
Throughout his college career (2012–2014), he appeared in 39 games for Alabama. In his last season before entering the draft, he logged at least 0.5 sacks in five straight games and finished the season with 9.0 sacks, 42 tackles, and 12.5 tackles for loss.

Professional career

NFL 
Dickson was drafted in the 7th round of the 2015 NFL draft by the New England Patriots. He was released by the Patriots on September 5, 2015.

He also spent time with the Atlanta Falcons on their practice squad.

Birmingham Iron 
On November 19, 2018, Dickson was picked up by the Birmingham Iron. In the season opener against the Memphis Express, Dickson intercepted an Express pass from quarterback Brandon Silvers. The league ceased operations in April 2019.

References

External links
 Alabama Crimson Tide bio

1992 births
Living people
African-American players of American football
African-American players of Canadian football
Alabama Crimson Tide football players
American football linebackers
Canadian football linebackers
Edmonton Elks players
New England Patriots players
People from Griffin, Georgia
Players of American football from Georgia (U.S. state)
Birmingham Iron players
21st-century African-American sportspeople